Aspropotamos (Greek: Ασπροπόταμος meaning the white river) is a former community in the Trikala regional unit, Thessaly, Greece. Since the 2011 local government reform it is part of the municipality Meteora, of which it is a municipal unit. The 2011 census recorded 419 residents in the municipal unit. The seat of the community was in Kallirroi (pop. 42).

Name
The community was named after the river Aspropotamos, a tributary of the Acheloos.

Geography
Aspropotamos is located in the southern Pindus mountains, in the westernmost part of Trikala regional unit, about 40 km west of Trikala and 20 km southeast of Metsovo. Aspropotamos covers an area of 297.082 km2. The largest settlement in the municipal unit is Agía Paraskeví (pop. 69).

Subdivisions
The municipal unit Aspropotamos is subdivided into the following communities (constituent villages in brackets):
Agia Paraskevi
Anthousa
Chaliki
Kallirroi
Katafyto (Katafyto, Milia)
Krania (Krania, Doliana, Konakia)
Polythea
Stefani

Population

See also
List of settlements in the Trikala regional unit

External links
Local website
Aspropotamos on GTP Travel Pages

References

Populated places in Trikala (regional unit)